is a railway station located in the city of Ichinoseki, Iwate Prefecture, Japan, operated by the East Japan Railway Company (JR East).

Lines
Rikuchū-Kanzaki Station is served by the Ōfunato Line, and is located 13.7 rail kilometers from the terminus of the line at Ichinoseki Station.

Station layout
Rikuchū-Kanzaki Station has two unnumbered opposed side platforms connected to the station building by a level crossing. The station is unattended.

Platforms

History
Rikuchū-Kanzaki Station opened on July 26, 1925. The station was absorbed into the JR East network upon the privatization of the Japan National Railways (JNR) on April 1, 1987. A new station building was completed in March 2010.

Surrounding area
 Kawasaki Station Road (shopping area)
 Sunatetsu River

See also
 List of Railway Stations in Japan

External links

  

Railway stations in Iwate Prefecture
Ōfunato Line
Railway stations in Japan opened in 1925
Ichinoseki, Iwate
Stations of East Japan Railway Company